Sally Curtis Keeble (born 13 October 1951) is a British Labour Party politician. She was the Member of Parliament (MP) for Northampton North from the 1997 to 2010 general elections, when she lost her seat to the Conservative Party candidate Michael Ellis. She had previously been Leader of Southwark Council from 1990 to 1993. Keeble stood as Labour's candidate for her former constituency in the three elections following her 2010 defeat, losing on all three occasions to Ellis.

Early life
Keeble went to the independent Cheltenham Ladies' College, and later attended St Hugh's College, Oxford, gaining a BA degree in Theology in 1973, and a BA in Sociology from the University of South Africa in 1981. Her father was the British diplomat Sir Curtis Keeble, a former ambassador to East Germany and the USSR. Before entering Parliament, she was a journalist in South Africa for the Daily News in Durban from 1973–79 and then in Birmingham for the Birmingham Post from 1978–83. She then worked for the Labour Party as a Press Officer at Labour Headquarters from 1983–84, then the Inner London Education Authority where she was Assistant Director for External Relations from 1984–86, and was Head of Communications for the GMB trade union from 1986–90 before becoming a full-time council leader in Inner London. She was a public affairs consultant from 1995–97.

Parliamentary career
In 1995, Keeble was selected to stand for the Labour Party in Northampton North through an all-women shortlist.

Keeble served on the Agriculture Select Committee (before its abolition in 2001), and became Parliamentary Private Secretary to Rt. Hon Hilary Armstrong in 1999. After the 2001 general election she was appointed Parliamentary Under Secretary of State at the Department of Transport, Local Government and the Regions, where her responsibilities included planning, regeneration, housing and local transport. She chaired the taskforce on parks and urban green spaces. In 2002, she moved to the Department for International Development. In 2003, she left the frontbench. From 2005, she was a member of the Treasury Select Committee.

Keeble introduced a private members bill to introduce the offence of causing death by careless driving: the measure was later accepted by the Government and introduced in the Road Safety Act 2006. She also introduced ten-minute rule bills on flooding, and a bill on minimum pricing for alcohol.

Keeble was involved in the 2009 United Kingdom Parliamentary Expenses scandal claiming £4,112 for windows at her Northampton house under the second home allowance, £3,072 for a new boiler and £950 for essential maintenance on the bathroom at her Northampton home.

At the 2010 general election, Keeble lost her Northampton North seat by 1,937 votes to the Conservative Party candidate Michael Ellis, a swing of 6.9% from the previous election.

At the 2019 United Kingdom general election Keeble failed to regain her Northampton North seat. The Conservative candidate Michael Ellis increased his majority to 5,507, a swing of 6% from the previous election, to hold his seat in Northampton North.

Keeble has stood as the Labour candidate at every general election between 1997 and 2019.

Personal life
Keeble married Andrew Hilary Porter on 9 June 1990 in Camberwell; the couple have a son and daughter together. She is an honorary fellow of South Bank University.

Her sister, Jane Mahoney, and her brother-in law Anthony; were killed on 12 July 1998 near Darwin in Australia. A Hells Angel motorcyclist had ploughed into them whilst they were waiting by the roadside after Anthony changed a wheel. The Hell's Angel carried on driving and failed to report the accident. After the accident, her father, Sir Curtis Keeble, the former British ambassador to the Soviet Union from 1978–82 and governor of the BBC, had a heart attack.

References

External links
 Sally Keeble MP
 Sally Keeble's blog
 Northampton Labour Group
 Northampton North CLP
 Northampton South CLP Labour2win
 Guardian Unlimited Politics - Ask Aristotle: Sally Keeble MP
 TheyWorkForYou.com - Sally Keeble MP
 BBC Politics page

News items
 Death by careless driving in January 2006

1951 births
Living people
Labour Party (UK) MPs for English constituencies
Councillors in the London Borough of Southwark
People educated at Cheltenham Ladies' College
Alumni of St Hugh's College, Oxford
Female members of the Parliament of the United Kingdom for English constituencies
UK MPs 1997–2001
UK MPs 2001–2005
UK MPs 2005–2010
20th-century British women politicians
21st-century British women politicians
20th-century English women
20th-century English people
21st-century English women
21st-century English people
Women councillors in England